Lamson may refer to:

Surname 
Chuck Lamson (1939–2015), American football player
Father Lamson, 19th-century American eccentric, attended abolitionist meetings in a long white beard and white robe, and carrying a large scythe
Fred I. Lamson (1910–1981), American politician, Mayor of Malden, Massachusetts, and  member of the Massachusetts Senate
George Henry Lamson (1852–1882), American doctor and murderer
Gertrude Lamson, or Nance O'Neil (1874–1965), American actress of stage and silent cinema of the early 20th century
Laura Lamson (1948–2008), American screenwriter and university lecturer, based in England throughout her career
Lucy Stedman Lamson (1857–1926), American business woman, educator
Otis Lamson (1876–1956), American football player and coach
Roswell Lamson (1838–1903), officer in the United States Navy during the American Civil War
William Lamson (born 1977), American installation, performance and generative artist

Middle name 
Carl Lamson Carmer (1893–1976), American author of nonfiction, memoirs and novels
Mortimer Lamson Earle (1864–1905), American classical scholar
Edward Lamson Henry (1841–1919), American genre painter
Flora Lamson Hewlett (1914–1977), American philanthropist
Nathaniel Lamson Howard (1884–1949), American railroad executive
Thomas Lamson Ludington (born 1953), United States federal judge
Edwin Lamson Stanton (1814–1869), Secretary of War under the Lincoln Administration during most of the American Civil War

Buildings 
Lamson Farm, a working 18th century farm and town-owned conservation land in Mont Vernon, New Hampshire
Newton Lamson House, historic house at 33 Chestnut Street in Stoneham, Massachusetts
Rufus Lamson House, historic house at 72-74 Hampshire Street in Cambridge, Massachusetts

Ships 
USS Lamson (DD-18), Smith class destroyer in the United States Navy during World War I
USS Lamson (DD-328), Clemson-class destroyer in the United States Navy following World War I
USS Lamson (DD-367), Mahan-class destroyer of the United States Navy named for Roswell Hawkes Lamson

Engineering 
Lamson L-106 Alcor, American, high-wing, experimental, pressurized research glider
Lamson tube, systems in which cylindrical containers are propelled through a network of tubes by compressed air or by partial vacuum
Lamson Engineering Company Ltd, the best known British manufacturer of Cash Ball, Rapid Wire and Pneumatic tube delivery systems from 1937 to 1976
Lamson PL-1 Quark, American high-wing, single-seat, glider that was designed and constructed by Philip Lamson, first flying in early 1965

Other 
Battle of Lamson or Operation Lam Son 719, offensive campaign conducted in Laos by the armed forces of the Republic of Vietnam in 1971
Flora Lamson Hewlett Library, houses one of the largest collections of theological books in the United States

See also
Lampson (disambiguation)